Mitchell James Hunt (born 19 June 1995) is a New Zealand rugby union player who currently plays as a first five-eighth or fullback for  in the Bunnings NPC and the  in the Super Rugby competition.

Early career
Born and raised in the city of Nelson in the South Island of New Zealand, Hunt attended Nelson College in his hometown where he enjoyed a successful time, playing 51 times for their top side. He moved north to study engineering at the University of Auckland after graduating college and began playing local club rugby in the Auckland area. During his time in Auckland, he was a member of the  development squad and Auckland's national sevens team.

Senior career
He returned home to Nelson in 2016 and turned out for the Tasman Mako. Playing mainly in the number 15 jersey, Hunt started all 12 games for the Mako during the season which again saw him finish on the losing side once again in the final, with Canterbury once more coming out on top. Hunt was part of the Tasman side that won the Mitre 10 Cup for the first time in 2019. He was picked in the North Island squad for the North vs South rugby union match in 2020 coming off the bench in a 35-38 loss for the North. In Round 6 of the 2020 Mitre 10 Cup Hunt played his 50th game for the Mako against  at Eden Park in Auckland. The Mako went on to win their second premiership title in a row with Hunt starting all 12 games in the number 10 jersey and scoring 97 points in the 2020 season. Hunt was named as co captain of the Tasman Mako squad for the 2021 Bunnings NPC alongside Quinten Strange with the absence of regular captain David Havili due to All Blacks duties.

Super Rugby
Just 7 appearances in his debut season of provincial rugby were all it took to convince the Christchurch based  that he was worthy of a Super Rugby contract. He made their senior squad for the first time in 2016 and made 2 substitute appearances during his debut campaign. He was retained for the 2017 Super Rugby season.

International
Hunt was a member of the New Zealand side which won the 2015 World Rugby Under 20 Championship in Italy.

References

1995 births
Living people
New Zealand rugby union players
Rugby union fly-halves
Rugby union fullbacks
People educated at Nelson College
Rugby union players from Nelson, New Zealand
Auckland rugby union players
Crusaders (rugby union) players
Tasman rugby union players
Highlanders (rugby union) players